James Leeper Johnson (October 30, 1818 – February 12, 1877) was a U.S. Representative from Kentucky.

Born near Smithland, Kentucky, Johnson attended private schools. He moved to Owensboro, Kentucky, in 1836. He studied law. He was admitted to the bar in 1841 and commenced practice in Owensboro. He owned slaves. He served as a member of the Kentucky House of Representatives in 1844.

Johnson was elected as a Whig to the Thirty-first Congress (March 4, 1849 – March 3, 1851). He was nominated for reelection in 1850 but declined to accept. He resumed the practice of law in Owensboro and also engaged in agricultural pursuits. He was appointed judge of the Daviess County circuit court on May 4, 1867, and served until September 2 of that year. He died in Owensboro, Kentucky, on February 12, 1877. He was interred in Rosehill Elmwood Cemetery.

References

1818 births
1877 deaths
People from Livingston County, Kentucky
American people of English descent
Whig Party members of the United States House of Representatives from Kentucky
Members of the Kentucky House of Representatives
Kentucky state court judges
American slave owners
19th-century American judges